Manihari Ghat ferry disaster occurred on 6 August 1988 in Indian state of Bihar when an overcrowded ferry carrying pilgrims across the Ganges capsized as it reached the middle of the river near Manihari Ghat (near the town Manihari), killing over 400 people.

References 
 400 Now Feared Dead on Ganges Ferry

Maritime incidents in India
1988 in India
Shipwrecks in rivers
Ferry transport in India
Ganges
Disasters in Bihar
History of Bihar (1947–present)
Maritime incidents in 1988
Katihar district